Sivanandeswarar Temple
(திருப்பந்துறை சிவானந்தேசுவரர் கோயில்
])is a Hindu temple located at Tirupandurai in Thanjavur district, Tamil Nadu, India. The presiding deity is Shiva. He is called as Sivanandeswarar. His consort is known as Mangalambikai.

Location:
Sri Sivanantheswarar Temple Padal petra sthalam,
Tirupandurai Rd, Thiruppandurai, Tamil Nadu 612602

near Nachiyarkoil

Significance 
It is one of the shrines of the 275 Paadal Petra Sthalams - Shiva Sthalams glorified in the early medieval Tevaram poems by Tamil Saivite Nayanar Tirugnanasambandar.

Literary Mention 
 Tirugnanasambandar describes the feature of the deity as:

References

External links 
 
 

Shiva temples in Thanjavur district
Padal Petra Stalam